Tadashi Sasaki may refer to:

 Tadashi Sasaki (banker) (1907–1988)
 Tadashi Sasaki (engineer) (1915–2018)
 Tadashi Sasaki (footballer) (born 1966)
 Tadashi Sasaki (musician) (born 1943)